The 2005–06 Argentine Primera División was the 115th season of top-flight football in Argentina. The season ran from 5 August 2005 to 14 May 2006. 

Tiro Federal (2004–05 Primera B Nacional champion) and Gimnasia y Esgrima de Jujuy (after beating Huracán in a second promotion playoff) were promoted from Primera B Nacional.

Boca Juniors won both, Apertura and Clausura championships totalising 28 league titles to date, while Instituto (C), Tiro Federal and Olimpo were relegated.

Torneo Apertura

Final standings

Top scorers

Torneo Clausura

Final standings

Top scorers

Relegation

Relegation table

Promotion playoff 

''Belgrano de Córdoba promoted to Primera (relegating Olimpo), while Argentinos Juniors remained in the top division by sporting advantage (the series had ended 4–4 on aggregate)

See also
2005–06 in Argentine football

Notes

References

Primera Division 2005-06
Argentine Primera División seasons